Robert Ssentongo (born 5 June 1988) is an Ugandan international footballer who plays for Kyetume FC, as a striker.

Club career
Born in Kampala, Ssentongo has played club football for Simba, SC Villa, Kampala City Council, Brabrand, African Lyon, URA, Saint George, Fasil Kenema, and Kyetume FC.

He scored a hat trick in the FUFA Big League promotion playoffs final in 2019 to help Kyetume FC earn promotion to the top flight for the first time.

In 2018 he signed for Kyetume FC.

International career
He made his senior international debut for Uganda in 2004, and has appeared in FIFA World Cup qualifying matches. He was the top scorer at the 2012 Cecafa-Tusker Challenge Cup. He was a squad member at the 2016 African Nations Championship.

Honours
Individual
Cecafa-Tusker Challenge Cup top scorer (1): 2012
Uganda Premier League top scorer (4): 2004, 2011–12, 2014–15, 2015–16
Uganda Premier League Team of the Season (1): 2015–16

References

1988 births
Living people
Ugandan footballers
Uganda international footballers
Association football forwards
Ugandan expatriate footballers
Ugandan expatriate sportspeople in Denmark
Expatriate men's footballers in Denmark
Ugandan expatriate sportspeople in Tanzania
Expatriate footballers in Tanzania
Ugandan expatriate sportspeople in Ethiopia
Expatriate footballers in Ethiopia
Simba FC players
SC Villa players
Kampala Capital City Authority FC players
Brabrand IF players
African Lyon F.C. players
Uganda Revenue Authority SC players
Saint George S.C. players
Fasil Kenema S.C. players
Kyetume FC players
Tanzanian Premier League players
Sportspeople from Kampala
Uganda A' international footballers
2016 African Nations Championship players